Sherif Mounir (sometimes credited as: Sherif Moneer),, born May 14, 1959, in El Mansoura (المنصورة) in Dakahlia Governorate (محافظة الدقهلية) as Sherif Ahmed Mounir, is a popular Egyptian movie and stage actor.

Works

Selected filmography

References

External links
 

1959 births
Living people
20th-century Egyptian male actors
21st-century Egyptian male actors
Egyptian male stage actors
Egyptian Muslims
People from Dakahlia Governorate